Deerhound may refer to:

Dog Breeds 
 Armstrong Siddeley Deerhound
 Pampas Deerhound
 Scottish Deerhound

Other Uses 
 T17 Deerhound armored car
 MT Deerhound tugboat
 SS Deerhound (1901) passenger ship
 Armstrong Siddeley Deerhound aero engine